Thomas Ballard (1630–1689) was a colonial Virginia landowner and politician.

Thomas Ballard may also refer to:

 Thomas Ballard Jr. (1654–1710), member of the Virginia House of Burgesses
 Thomas Ballard (MP for Coventry), member of Parliament for Coventry in 1301
 Thomas Ballard (fl. 1388), MP for Reigate
 Thomas Ballard (fl. 1373), MP for Wycombe
 Tom Ballard (born 1989), Australian comedian, radio and television presenter
 Tom Ballard (climber) (1988–2019), British rock climber and alpinist